Hartley is a surname. Notable people with the surname include:

 Adele Hartley, Edinburgh film festival organiser
 Aidan Hartley (born 1965), British journalist
 A. J. Hartley (born 1964), British-born New York Times-bestselling author and Shakespearean dramaturg
 Al Hartley (1921–2003), American comic book writer
 Sir Andreas de Harcla, or Andrew Harclay, 1st Earl of Carlisle (c. 1270 – 1323)
 A. N. Hartley (1902–1994), English dog breeder
 Alex Hartley (born 1963), British artist
 Alfred Hartley (1879–1918), English cricketer
 Ann Hartley (born 1942), New Zealand member of parliament
 Anne Jane Hartley, birth name of the actress Ann Gilbert
 Anthony Hartley (1925–2000), British writer and critic
 Arthur Hartley (1889–1960), British civil engineer
 Bill Hartley (activist) (1930–2006), Australian political activist
 Bill Hartley (athlete) (born 1950), English athlete
 Blythe Hartley (born 1982), Canadian Olympic diver
 Bob Hartley (born 1960), Canadian National Hockey League coach
 Brendon Hartley (born 1989), New Zealand racing car driver
 Bria Hartley (born 1992), American basketball player
 Charles Hartley (disambiguation), several people, including
 Charles Augustus Hartley (1825–1915), British engineer 
 Charles Hartley (educationist) (1865–1935), British educationist
 Charlie Hartley (Lancashire cricketer) (1873–1927), American-born English cricketer
 Charlie Hartley (Kent cricketer) (born 1994), English cricketer
 David Hartley (disambiguation)
 David Hartley (computer scientist), (born 1937)
 David Hartley (cricketer) (born 1963), English cricketer
 David Hartley (figure skater), British figure skater
 David Hartley (musician), known for working with Sting
 David Hartley (philosopher) (1705–1757), English philosopher and psychologist
 David Hartley (politician), member of the Ohio House of Representatives
 David Hartley (rugby league), English rugby league footballer of the 1960s and 1970s
 David Hartley (the Younger) (1731–1813), Member of Parliament and son of the English philosopher
 Dylan Hartley (born 1986), England rugby union player
 Edmund Barron Hartley (1847–1919), British Victoria Cross recipient
 Elizabeth Hartley (disambiguation) several people, including
 Elizabeth Hartley (Girl Guides) (born 1906), English Girl Guide and author
 Elizabeth Hartley (actress) (1751–1824), English actress
 Elizabeth Hartley (archaeologist) (1947–2018), American archaeologist and museum curator
 Fergal Hartley (born 1973), Irish hurler
 F. J. Hartley (Rev. Francis John "Frank" Hartley, 1909–1971), Australian peace activist
 Fred A. Hartley, Jr. (1902–1969), U.S. politician, known for sponsoring the Taft-Hartley Act
 Gene Hartley (1926–1993), American racecar driver
 Grover Hartley (1888–1964), American baseball player
 Hal Hartley (born 1959), American film director
 Harry J. Hartley (born 1938), American academic administrator
 Herman Otto Hartley (1912–1980), German-American statistician
 J. R. Hartley, a fictional character and an author's pseudonym
 Jane D. Hartley, American politician 
 Jean Hartley (1933–2011), English autobiographer and publisher
 Jess Hartley (born 1967), American author and writer
 Jesse Hartley (1780–1860), British civil engineer
 Jo Hartley (born 1972), English actress
 John Hartley (disambiguation), several people including:
John Hartley (poet)  (1839–1915), English poet
John Anderson Hartley (1844–1896), Australian educationalist
John Hartley (tennis) (1849–1935), English clergyman who won Wimbledon
John Hartley (cricketer) (1874–1963), English cricketer, played for Oxford and Sussex
 Jonathan Scott Hartley (1845–1912), American sculptor
 Julia Hartley-Brewer, British journalist
 Justin Hartley (born 1977), American actor
 Keef Hartley (1944-2011), British musician
 L. P. Hartley (1895–1972), British author
 Linda Hartley-Clark (born 1966), Australian actress
 Lindsay Hartley (born 1978), American singer and actress
 Mariette Hartley (born 1940), American actress
 Marsden Hartley (1877–1943), American artist 
 Matthieu Hartley (born 1960), English musician
 Mike Hartley (born 1961), American baseball player
 Nina Hartley (born 1959), adult-film actress
 Oliver C. Hartley (1823–1859), American lawyer
 Paul Hartley (born 1976), Scottish footballer
 Peter Hartley (cricketer) (born 1960), English cricketer
 Peter Hartley (footballer) (born 1988), English footballer
 Ralph Hartley (1888–1970), American electronics researcher
 Richard Hartley (disambiguation)
 Robert Hartley (born 1915), British stage, film and television actor
 Roland H. Hartley (1864-1952), American politician
 Steven Hartley (born 1960), British actor
 Sue Hartley, British ecologist
 Thomas Hartley (1748–1800), American lawyer
 Vivian Hartley (1913–1963), birth name of the actress Vivien Leigh
 Wallace Hartley (1878–1912), English violinist and band leader who died on the Titanic
 Walter Hartley (born 1927), American composer
 Walter Noel Hartley (1845–1913), British chemist and spectroscopy pioneer
 William Hartley (disambiguation) several people, including
 William Hartley (martyr) (1557–1588), English Roman Catholic priest and martyr
 William Hartley (politician) (1868–1950), Australian politician
 William G. Hartley (born 1942), American historian and author
 William James Hartley (born 1945), political figure in British Columbia, Canada
 William Leonard Hartley (1916–2003), insurance salesman and politician in British Columbia, Canada
 William Pickles Hartley (1846–1922), jam manufacturer and philanthropist

English-language surnames